Thomas Brodie (1903–1993) was a British Army soldier.

Thomas Brodie or Tom Brodie may also refer to:
Thomas Brodie (Royal Navy officer) (1779–1811)
Sir Thomas Dawson Brodie, 1st Baronet (1832–1896) of the Brodie baronets
Thomas Gregor Brodie (1866–1916), British physiologist
Thomas L. Brodie (born 1943), Irish theologian
Tom Brodie (actor) (born 1978), English actor

See also
Brodie (surname)
Thomas Brodie-Sangster (born 1990), English actor and musician